The Limici were an ancient Celtic tribe of Gallaecia, living in the swamps of the river Lima, in the border region between Minho (Portugal) and Galicia (Spain).

See also
Pre-Roman peoples of the Iberian Peninsula

External links
Detailed map of the Pre-Roman Peoples of Iberia (around 200 BC)

Tribes of Gallaecia
Ancient peoples of Portugal